Evolution is the fifth studio album by American rock band Journey, released in March 1979 by Columbia Records. It is the band's first album to feature drummer Steve Smith.

It was the band's most successful album at the time, reaching No. 20 on the US Billboard 200 chart, and has sold three million copies in the US. They retained Roy Thomas Baker (best known for his work with Queen) as producer, but drummer Aynsley Dunbar was replaced with Smith, formerly with Ronnie Montrose's band.

Evolution features their first top 20 hit, "Lovin', Touchin', Squeezin'", which was inspired by the classic Sam Cooke top 20 hit "Nothin' Can Change This Love" and reached No. 16 in the US. "Just the Same Way" featured original lead vocalist Gregg Rolie along with Steve Perry.  Record World called "Just the Same Way" a "hard but slick rocker."

Record World said that the single "Too Late" "takes the rock ballad to new limits with a call & response hookline and Neal Schon's dashing guitar break."

Track listing

Personnel 
Journey
 Steve Perry – lead vocals
 Gregg Rolie – keyboards, piano, backing vocals, co-lead vocals (8)
 Neal Schon – guitars, Roland GR-500 guitar synthesizer, backing vocals
 Ross Valory – bass guitar, Moog bass, backing vocals
 Steve Smith – drums, percussion

Production 
 Roy Thomas Baker – producer, mixing
 Geoff Workman – engineer
 George Tutko – second engineer
 Greg Schafer – production manager
 Larry Noggle, Jim Welch – package design
 Alton Kelley, Stanley Mouse – cover art
 Sam Emerson – back cover photography, liner photography
 Hiro Ito – liner photography
 Pat Morrow – liner notes
 Herbie Herbert – management

Charts 
 

Album

Singles
Just the Same Way

Lovin', Touchin', Squeezin

Too Late

Certifications

References 

1979 albums
Journey (band) albums
Columbia Records albums
Albums produced by Roy Thomas Baker